Petkovac may refer to:

 Petkovac, Bosnia and Herzegovina, a village in Bosnia
 Petkovac, Croatia, a village near Petrinja, Croatia